Jenna Haze (born 1982) is an American director, model, and former pornographic actress.

Haze has won numerous pornographic industry awards, including the 2003 AVN Award for Best New Starlet and the 2009 AVN Award for Female Performer of the Year, making her the second performer in history to ever win both awards in the course of her career, after Missy. In 2012, she was inducted into both the AVN and XRCO Halls of Fame.

Career 
Haze entered the adult film industry on July 18, 2001. Between 2002 and 2005, she was a contract girl for the film company Jill Kelly Productions. During most of her time at the company, she performed exclusively with women, out of loyalty to her then boyfriend, an industry cameraman. She returned to working with men in the 2006 multi-award-winning release Jenna Haze Darkside, produced by Jules Jordan.

Her first scene was for The Oral Adventures of Craven Moorehead 8 with her agent Slim Shady (Dez) and his best friend, Moorehead. It was intended to only be an oral sex scene, but in the heat of the moment she had intercourse with both. The next day she shot a scene with Miles Long in Joey Silvera's Service Animals 4.

In February 2002, Haze appeared in a scene for Jill Kelly Productions (JKP), directed by Jill Kelly herself. Kelly was impressed by her performance and JKP offered Haze an exclusive performing contract. This was soon followed by offers from other companies, but in April 2002 Haze decided to sign with JKP, as they offered the extra flexibility she needed to make money and build her career. Soon after signing with JKP, she formed a serious relationship with an industry cameraman and began a three-year period of performing exclusively with women. At the 2003 AVN Awards ceremony, Haze was named Best New Starlet and her masturbation scene in Big Bottom Sadie was awarded Best Solo Sex Scene. In 2004, she appeared on the HBO show Pornucopia, a six-part documentary on the pornography industry in California.

Haze became a free agent in April 2005, after deciding not to renew her contract with JKP, partly because Jill Kelly had recently left the company. After leaving JKP and splitting with her boyfriend, Haze returned to working with male performers. The April 2006 release Jenna Haze Darkside featured her first boy-girl scenes in over three years. The film was produced and directed by her new boyfriend Jules Jordan. Later in the year, she began writing a sex advice column for the pornographic magazine, Fox.

In 2006 she also started performing in striptease shows, represented by the agency Lee Network. The first achievement in her feature dancing career was a nomination for Best Feature Entertainer at the 2007 Night Moves Awards. Her film work was also rewarded in 2007, with AVN Awards for Best Oral Sex Scene (Video) and Best Group Sex Scene (Video), as well as a nomination for Female Performer of the Year.

In April 2007, Jenna Haze Oil Orgy became the first adult movie to be released on three high definition formats, Blu-ray, HD DVD and DVD-WMV. Meanwhile, in the same month, her official website was launched by Premium Multimedia.

In January 2008, her scene with Manuel Ferrara in Evil Anal 2 won the AVN Award for Best Couples Sex Scene (Video). In August 2008, Haze achieved the first feature dancing award of her career winning Adult Movie Entertainer of the Year in the 11th annual Adult Nightclub and Exotic Dancer Awards. On January 10, 2009, Haze and Belladonna hosted the 2009 AVN Awards, and Haze won Female Performer of the Year.

In 2010, Complex ranked Haze sixteenth on their list of "The 50 Prettiest Porn Stars of All Time" and fifth on their list of "The 10 Hottest Orange County Women." Complex also ranked her twentieth on their list of "The Top 100 Hottest Porn Stars (Right Now)" in 2011. She was also placed on CNBC's yearly list of "The Dirty Dozen: Porn's Most Popular Stars" in 2011 and 2012.

On February 7, 2012, Haze announced her retirement from performing via a homemade YouTube video, followed by a press release. She revealed that she had not shot a scene since April 2011, but she would possibly continue to direct and produce.

Jennaration X Studios 
In 2009, Haze launched her own production company, Jennaration X Studios, headed by Haze and distributed through Jules Jordan Video. Haze is directing and performing in her production films.

Jennaration X's debut film, Cum-Spoiled Sluts, (featuring scenes with Haze, Johnny Sins, Nikki Rhodes and James Deen) was released March 23, 2009, followed by Anal Academics which was released July 6, 2009.

Appearances 
In the 2007 mainstream comedy film, Superbad, Haze made a short appearance in the role of Vagtastic Voyage Girl #2. Haze made a short appearance in the 2009 action/thriller film Crank: High Voltage as a porn star on strike.

Published in 2007, Haze was among the adult stars featured in the erotic photography book Naked Ambition: An R-Rated Look at an X-Rated Industry. The special edition of the book included a fine art photograph of Haze signed by the photographer Michael Grecco.

Shortly after announcing her retirement in 2012, Haze appeared in the March edition of the men's magazine FHM in a layout with former Gossip Girl star Taylor Momsen, and shortly thereafter had a cameo in Momsen's band The Pretty Reckless' music video for the song "My Medicine". She then appeared onstage with the band at their March 13 Los Angeles House Of Blues performance and gave Momsen an impromptu lap dance.

Awards

Personal life 
According to her social media pages, Haze returned to school and majored in psychology.

In 2012 and 2013, Haze was romantically involved with heavy metal singer Greg Puciato.

References

External links 

 
 
 
 

1982 births
21st-century American businesswomen
21st-century American businesspeople
21st-century American actresses
American female adult models
American pornographic film actresses
American pornographic film directors
American pornographic film producers
Living people
Women pornographic film directors
Women pornographic film producers
American women film producers